The law of Texas is derived from the Constitution of Texas and consists of several levels, including constitutional, statutory, and regulatory law, as well as case law and local laws and regulations.

Sources

The Constitution of Texas is the foremost source of state law. Legislation is enacted by the Texas Legislature, published in the General and Special Laws, and codified in the Texas Statutes. State agencies publish regulations (sometimes called administrative law) in the Texas Register, which are in turn codified in the Texas Administrative Code. The Texas legal system is based on common law, which is interpreted by case law through the decisions of the Supreme Court, the Court of Criminal Appeals, and the Courts of Appeals, which are published in the Texas Cases and South Western Reporter. Counties and municipal governments may also promulgate local ordinances.

Constitution
The Constitution of Texas is the foundation of the government of Texas and vests the legislative power of the state in the Texas Legislature. The Texas Constitution is subject only to the sovereignty of the people of Texas as well as the Constitution of the United States, although this is disputed.

Article I of the Constitution of Texas contains the following provisions related to limitations on legislative power:

 Sec. 16 prohibits bills of attainder, ex post facto or retroactive laws, or laws "impairing the obligations of contracts." 
 Sec. 29 provides that "no power of suspending laws in this State shall be exercised except by the Legislature.

Article II of the Constitution of Texas mandates the separation of powers in to three distinct department, the Legislative, Executive, and Judicial.

Article III of the Constitution of Texas is specifically dedicated to the Legislative Department.

Legislation
Pursuant to the state constitution, the Texas Legislature has enacted various laws, known as "chapter laws" or generically as "slip laws". These are published in the official General and Special Laws of the State of Texas as "session laws". Most of these statutes are codified.

The Texas Constitution requires the Texas Legislature to revise, digest, and publish the laws of the state; however, it has never done so regularly. In 1925 the Texas Legislature reorganized the statutes into three major divisions: the Revised Civil Statutes, Penal Code, and Code of Criminal Procedure. In 1963, the Texas legislature began a major revision of the 1925 Texas statutory classification scheme, and as of 1989 over half of the statutory law had been arranged under the recodification process.

The de facto codifications are Vernon's Texas Statutes Annotated and Vernon's Texas Codes Annotated, commonly known as Vernon's. The unannotated constitution, codes, and statutes can also be accessed online through a website of the Texas Legislative Council. Gammel's Laws of Texas contains relevant legislation from 1822-1897.

Most, but not all, Texas statutes have been codified in the following codes:
 Agriculture Code
 Alcoholic Beverage Code
 Business and Commerce Code
 Business Organizations Code
 Civil Practice and Remedies Code
 Code Of Criminal Procedure
 Education Code
 Election Code
 Estates Code
 Family Code
 Finance Code
 Government Code
 Health and Safety Code
 Human Resources Code
 Insurance Code
 Labor Code
 Local Government Code
 Natural Resources Code
 Occupations Code
 Parks and Wildlife Code
 Penal Code
 Property Code
 Special District Local Laws Code
 Tax Code
 Transportation Code
 Utilities Code
 Water Code

Regulations

The body of regulations promulgated by state agencies is referred to as  administrative law. The Texas Administrative Code contains the compiled and indexed regulations of Texas state agencies and is published yearly by the Secretary of State. The Texas Register contains proposed rules, notices, executive orders, and other information of general use to the public and is published weekly by the Secretary of State. Both are also available online through the Secretary of State's website.

Case law

The Texas legal system is based on common law, which is interpreted by case law through the decisions of the Texas Supreme Court, the Texas Court of Criminal Appeals, and the Texas Courts of Appeals. There is no longer an officially published reporter. West's Texas Cases (a Texas-specific version of the South Western Reporter) includes reported opinions of the Supreme Court, the Court of Criminal Appeals, and the Courts of Appeals. The Texas Reports includes Supreme Court opinions until July 1962, and the Texas Criminal Reports includes Court of Criminal Appeals opinions until November 1962. Appellate opinions from 1997–2002 onwards are generally available online.

There is no systematic reporting of decisions of trial courts. Online availability of case filings at the trial court level varies drastically: some district courts and county courts at law allow online access to download case filings, either for free or for a fee, either to registered users (sometimes restricted by attorney status) or to all users, whereas other trial courts only allow online access to the clerk's register of actions or the case docket, or no online access at all. For example, the Harris County District Clerk's website requires users to register for free in order to download case filings. The Harris County Clerk similarly requires registration in order to download case filings, though the search function is available to unregistered users. In Dallas County, the District Clerk and County Clerk's records are available from a single online portal which allows for most non-sensitive case filings to be downloaded without registration. Filings from all 254 Texas counties can be searched by registered users for free through the statewide re:SearchTX portal, though a payment of $.10 (ten cents) per page is required for downloads.

Local ordinances

Municipal governments may promulgate local ordinances, rules, and police regulations, and are usually codified in a "code of ordinances". Counties in Texas have limited regulatory (ordinance) authority. Some codes are printed by private publishers, and some are available online, but the most common method of discovering local ordinances is by physically traveling to the seat of government and asking around.

Age of criminal responsibility
Criminal courts in Texas have automatic jurisdiction over all persons over 17 years of age.  there was advocacy to raise the age to 18. The Texas House of Representatives passed such a bill in 2017 that would be effective 2021. In August 2017 there were thirty-three prisoners in adult prisons and/or state jails who were below the age of 18.

In Texas the minimum age at which a child may be adjudicated as delinquent is 10.

Murder statutes
Capital murder convictions have two options: life imprisonment without parole and death. Prior to 2005 life with parole and death were the two options, but that year the Texas Legislature modified the statute. Maurice Chammah , author of Let the Lord Sort Them: The Rise and Fall of the Death Penalty, stated that governments of smaller counties supported the move as death penalty cases had increasing costs.

See also

Topics
 Alcohol laws of Texas
 Capital punishment in Texas
 Expungement in Texas
 Felony murder rule (Texas)
 Gambling in Texas
 Gun laws in Texas
 Deregulation of the Texas electricity market
 LGBT rights in Texas
 Legal status of Texas

Other
 Politics of Texas
 Law enforcement in Texas
 Crime in Texas
 Law of the United States

References

External links
 Texas Constitution from the Texas Legislative Council
 Texas Statutes from the Texas Legislative Council
 Texas Administrative Code from the Texas Secretary of State
 General and Special Laws of Texas from the Texas Legislative Reference Library Legislative Archive System
 Gammel's The Laws of Texas from the University of North Texas Libraries
 Texas Register from the Texas Secretary of State
 Texas Register archives from the University of North Texas Libraries
 Harris County regulations from the Harris County Attorney
 Dallas County Code from Municode
 Local ordinance codes from Public.Resource.Org
 Case law: 

 
State law in the United States
Texas statutes